Bangladesh–Brazil relations refer to the bilateral relations between Bangladesh and Brazil. Bangladesh has an embassy in Brasillia and Brazil has an embassy in Dhaka.

The two countries have rapidly growing trade links.

High level visits 
Bangladesh Foreign Secretary Mohamed Mijarul Quayes paid an official visit to Brasilia in 2011.

Cooperation in international forums 

In 2013, Bangladesh has sought Brazil's support for its candidature at the Human Rights Council in 2015 and Non-permanent seat of the UN Security Council for 2016–17 term. In 2014, Brazil assured its support to Bangladesh for the posts of United Nations Human Rights Commission and CEDAW (The Convention on the Elimination of All Forms of Discrimination against Women). Bangladesh also supported Brazil's candidature for the post of Director General of World Trade Organization. Brazil has also given Bangladesh $3 million in aid for disaster management.

Cooperation in culture, education and agriculture 
In 2011, Brazil proposed to sign an agreement for cooperation in various potential sectors, including agriculture, health, education and sports. In 2014, Brazil has expressed its interest in extending cooperation to Bangladesh for agricultural development.

Economic relations 
The bilateral trade between the two countries stood at US$1.7 billion, as of 2017. Brazil's main export to Bangladesh include agricultural products like sugar. Bangladesh has been exporting jute, ready made garments and pharmaceutical products. The trade surplus is heavily tilted in favor of Brazil.

References 

 
Brazil
Bilateral relations of Brazil